Cactus Springs is a ghost town in Nye County, Nevada. It is currently within the boundaries of the Nellis Air Force Range.

Activity began in 1901 with the discovery of turquoise on Cactus Peak.  Silver was discovered nearby in 1904, and by 1910 the Lincoln Gold Mining Company had constructed a small camp near its holdings called Camp Rockefeller.

Activity in the Cactus Range ended by 1935 and the camp never had a population greater than approximately 50 persons.

Notes

References
 

1901 establishments in Nevada
Ghost towns in Nye County, Nevada
Populated places established in 1901